The English singer and songwriter Olly Murs has recorded songs for five studio albums and collaborated with other artists on their respective singles. The singer came to prominence after he finished in second place on the sixth series of The X Factor in 2009, losing to Joe McElderry. While competing on the show, Murs, along with the other finalists, was featured on a cover of "You Are Not Alone" originally performed by Michael Jackson. Released as a charity single, the proceeds were donated to Great Ormond Street Hospital.
Despite being the runner-up, Simon Cowell's record label Syco revealed that they had signed Murs as a joint-venture with Epic following the show in February 2010. The singer began to work on his self-titled debut studio album, which was released on 26 November 2010. The album was preceded by the release of its lead single, reggae-pop track "Please Don't Let Me Go". Lyrically, "Please Don't Let Me Go" is based on a previous relationship of Murs', in which the woman did not love him back, he asks her to not to let go of him so soon. Some of the tracks present Murs as being critical of his ex-girlfriends' new boyfriend, including "A Million More Years" and the second single, "Thinking of Me". Written by Adam Argyle and Martin Brammer, "I Blame Hollywood" draws influence from pop rock. Murs co-wrote the song "Love Shines Down" with Ed Sheeran, and it features guest vocalist Jessie J, while "Heart on My Sleeve" is a cover song written by James Morrison and originally performed by Michael Johns.

Murs' second studio album, the retro-pop themed In Case You Didn't Know, was released on 25 November 2011. The composition of "Oh My Goodness" is composed of an organ and horns, while the title track, "Heart Skips a Beat" and "Tell the World" draw influence from reggae. "Dance with Me Tonight" is a 1950s saxophone style record with elements of Doo-wop, while the track "Just Smile" is reminiscent of the work of Burt Bacharach. The disco-pop themed Right Place Right Time, Murs' third studio album, was released on 26 November 2012. Murs co-wrote the majority of the album with songwriters Steve Robson, Wayne Hector and Ed Drewett. "Troublemaker" was released as the lead single from the album, and it features Flo Rida. Lyrically, it documents Murs' obsession for a woman who he knows is not good for him but he cannot resist her, while Flo Rida delivers a rap verse explaining why he finds alluring women attractive. The BBC's critic John Aizlewood described album tracks "Head to Toe" as adult-themed and "Dear Darlin as solemn in its composition.

Murs' fourth studio album, Never Been Better, was released on 20 November 2014. Murs stated that he wanted the album to have a more serious tone and less of a "cheeky" style owing to him turning 30 years old. Travie McCoy and Demi Lovato feature on the songs "Wrapped Up" and "Up", respectively. The former is a funk track which whereby Murs suggestively sings "You got the lock, I got the key/ You know the rest, you know just where I want to be," while the latter is a folk song about the "merits of perseverance". The song "Stick with Me" addresses loneliness, while the piano-ballad "Tomorrow" documents how difficult it is to hold onto "fleeting private moments" when in the public eye. Murs co-wrote the track "Let Me In" with Paul Weller, which was described by Neil McCormick of The Daily Telegraph as "unexpected". Digital Spy writer Amy Davison likened the disco track "Did You Miss Me?" to Justin Timberlake's song "Take Back the Night".

Songs

See also 
 Olly Murs discography

Notes

References

External links 
Olly Murs discography on AllMusic

Murs, Olly